Nicholas IV, Lord of Werle[-Goldberg], nicknamed Poogenoge ("Pig's eyes") (born: before 1331; died: between 14 March and 13 November 1354) was from 1350 to 1354 to Lord of Werle-Goldberg.

Biography
He was the son of John III and Matilda of Pomerania (born: abt. 1304, died: 1331).  He allegedly received his nickname from the shape and the look in his eyes.

He initially ruled the dominion Werle-Goldberg jointly with his father John III and from 1350 alone.  He still signed a peace treaty on 14 March 1354, but is no longer mentioned after 13 November of that year.

He was married to Agnes (died after 1361).  Presumably, she was a daughter of daughter of Ulrich II of Lindow-Ruppin.  After Nicholas' death, she married John I of Mecklenburg-Stargard.

Issue 
Nicholas had at least three children:
 John IV succeeded him as Lord of Werle-Goldberg
 Matilda (died: before 17 December 1402) married Lorenz of Werle
 Agnes married  John VI of Werle-Waren

External links 
 Genealogical table of the House of Mecklenburg
 Biographical information on Nicholas at emecklenburg.de

Lords of Werle
House of Mecklenburg
14th-century births
1354 deaths
Year of birth uncertain